Sinilabeo hummeli is a species of cyprinid of the genus Sinilabeo. It inhabits the upper Yangtze in China. It has not been evaluated on the IUCN Red List.

References

Cyprinid fish of Asia
Freshwater fish of China
Fish described in 2006